is an indoor sports arena, located in Kumamoto, Japan. 

The arena holds 4,110 people.

The hall hosted some of the group games for the 2007 FIVB Volleyball Women's World Cup. It also hosted some of the group games for the 2011 FIVB Volleyball Men's World Cup.

References

External links

Basketball venues in Japan
Indoor arenas in Japan
Volleyball venues in Japan
Sports venues in Kumamoto Prefecture
Sports venues completed in 1982
1982 establishments in Japan
Handball venues in Japan
Buildings and structures in Kumamoto
Kumamoto Volters